This is a list of established military terms which have been in use for at least 50 years. Since technology and doctrine have changed over time, not all of them are in current use, or they may have been superseded by more modern terms. However, they are still in current use in articles about previous military periods. Some of them like camouflet have been adapted to describe modern versions of old techniques.

Administrative
 Cantonment: a temporary or semi-permanent military quarters; in South Asia, the term cantonment also describes permanent military stations.
 Logistics
 Materiel (also matériel)
 Military supply chain management
 Staging area

Intelligence
 Signals intelligence (SIGINT) and signals intelligence in modern history
Electronic intelligence (ELINT)
High-frequency direction finding (nicknamed huff-duff) is the common name for a type of radio direction finding employed especially during the two world wars.
Communications intelligence (COMINT)
 Human intelligence (HUMINT)
 Imagery intelligence (IMINT)
 Measurement and signature intelligence (MASINT)
 Open-source intelligence (OSINT)

On land
 Demilitarized zone (DMZ): Area that is specifically established to be free from military presence or action. Often used to create a buffer between two conflicting states to prevent accidental border skirmishes and established by treaty or a third party peace keeper.
 No man's land: land that is not occupied or, more specifically, land that is under dispute between countries or areas that will not occupy it because of fear or uncertainty, or for tactical or strategical considerations. No man's land was what the Allied Expeditionary Force under the command of General Pershing would refer to the land separating the fronts of the two opposing armies, as it was deadly to be there.

Arms and services
 Artillery includes any engine used for the discharge of large projectiles.
 Artillery battery: an organized group of artillery pieces (previously artillery park).
 Also see below Artillery

Doctrinal
These terms are used for talking about how armed forces are used.
Many of the terms below can be applied to combat in other environments although most often used in reference to land warfare.

 Ambush: carrying out a surprise attack on an enemy that passes a concealed position.
 Artillery barrage: a line or barrier of exploding artillery shells, created by continuous and co-ordinated fire of a large number of guns.
 Battalia: an army or a subcomponent of an army such as a battalion in battle array (common military parlance in the 17th century).
 Blockade: a ring of naval vessels surrounding a specific port or even an entire nation. The goal is to halt the movement of goods which could help the blockaded nation's war effort.
 Booby trap
 Breach: a gap in fortified or battle lines.
 Breakout: exploiting a breach in enemy lines so that a large force (division or above) passes through.
 Bridgehead and its varieties known as beachheads and airheads.
 Charge: a large force heads directly to an enemy to engage in close quarters combat, with the hope of breaking the enemy line.
  Chequered retreat, (retraite en échiquier, Fr.) a line or battalion, alternately retreating and facing about in the presence of an enemy, exhibiting a deployment like chequered squares
 Column: a formation of soldiers marching in files in which the files is significantly longer than the width of ranks in the formation.
 Counterattack
 Counter-battery fire
 Coup de grâce: a death blow intended to end the suffering of a wounded soldier; also applied to severely damaged ships (called scuttling when applied to friendly ships).
 Coup de main: a swift pre-emptive strike.
 Debellatio: to end a war by complete destruction of a hostile state. More severe than sacking.
 Decisive victory: an overwhelming victory for one side, often shifting the course of conflict.
 Defilade: a unit or position is "defiladed" if it is protected from direct exposure to enemy fire; see also Hull-down.
DUSTOFF: a now traditional call sign for US Army Air Ambulance helicopter operations engaging in MEDEVAC.
 Echelon formation: a military formation in which members are arranged diagonally.
 Encirclement: surrounding enemy forces on all sides, isolating them.
 Enfilade: a unit (or position) is "enfiladed" when enemy fire can be directed along the long axis of the unit. For instance, a trench is enfiladed if the enemy can fire down the length of the trench. May also refer to placing a unit in a position to enfilade, or the position so enfiladed.
 Envelope
 Extraction point: the location designated for reassembly of forces and their subsequent transportation out of the battle zone.
 Fabian strategy: avoiding pitched battles in order to wear down the enemy in a war of attrition.
 Fighting withdrawal: pulling back military forces while maintaining contact with the enemy.
 File: a single column of soldiers.
 Flanking maneuver: to attack an enemy or an enemy unit from the side, or to maneuver to do so.
 Forlorn hope: a band of soldiers or other combatants chosen to take the leading part in a military operation, such as an assault on a defended position, where the risk of casualties is high. 
 Frontal assault or frontal attack: an attack toward the front of an enemy force.  
 Garrison: a body of troops holding a particular location on a long-term basis.
 Guerrilla tactics: attacking the enemy and the subsequent breaking off of contact and retreating; also referred to as "hit-and-run tactics".
 Hors de combat: a unit out of the fight, surrendered, wounded (when incapacitated), and so on.
 Infantry square, pike square, or schiltron
 Infiltration
 Interdiction: to attack and disrupt enemy supply lines.
 Killing field
 Lodgement: an enclave made by increasing the size of a bridgehead.
 MEDEVAC: the tactical medical evacuation of wounded from the field of battle by air, bringing them to a higher level of medical care and treatment, e.g. from a forward field location or a forward aid station to a combat support hospital, forward surgical team or other treatment facility able to provide significant stabilizing care or definitive treatment to the injured.
 Melee or Mêlée
 Mess: A place where troops gather for their meals
 Mikes: Minutes. When used in normal vernacular speaker will say will be ready in X-Mikes where X represents number of minutes. 
 Mobile columns, or movable columns (French:  or ) — in contrast to stationary troops troupes sédentaire. This may be used as a bureaucratic description to describe the function for which troops are raised for example the regiments of the Highland Fencible Corps were raised for garrison duties while Scottish line regiments in the British Army were raised to fight anywhere; or it may be an operational description.
 No quarter given: all enemy troops are to be killed, even those who surrender. Also referred to as "take no prisoners".
 Overwatch: tactical technique in which one unit is positioned in a vantage position to provide perimeter surveillance and immediate fire support for another friendly unit.
 Patrolling
 Parthian shot
 Phalanx
 Pickets (or picquets): sentries or advance troops specifically tasked with early warning of contact with the enemy. A soldier who has this job is on "picket duty", and may also be referred to as a "lookout." (see also Vedette, a mounted sentry or outpost)
 Pincer maneuver
 Pitched battle
 Pocket: see "salient".
 Pyrrhic victory: a victory paid for so dearly that it potentially could lead to a later defeat ("a battle won, a war lost").
 Raid
 Rank: a single line of soldiers.
 Reconnaissance
 Retreat: withdrawal of troops from a battlefield (can be either orderly or unorderly; fighting or by rout).
 Rout: disorderly withdrawal of troops from a battlefield following a defeat, either real or perceived.
 Sack: the destruction and looting of a city, usually after an assault.
 Safe-guard: individual soldiers or detachments placed to prevent resources (often farms full of crops and livestock) from being looted or plundered
 Salients: a pocket or "bulge" in a fortified or battle line. The enemy's line facing a salient is referred to as a "re-entrant".
 Scorched earth: the deliberate destruction of resources in order to deny their use to the enemy.
 Scuttlebutt: For gossip or water fountain.
 Scuttling: the deliberate destruction of a ship to prevent its capture and use by an enemy. Commonly used as a coup de grâce, but has also been a protest (as after the First World War).
 Shield wall: the massed use of interconnected shields to form a wall in battle.
 Shield wall (fortification): the highest and thickest wall of a castle protecting the main assault approach.
 Shoot and scoot: a type of fire-and-movement tactic used by artillery to avoid counter-battery fire.
 Siege: a military blockade of a city or fortress with the intent of conquering by force or attrition, often accompanied by an assault in the later phase.
Siege en régle: A siege where a city or fortress is invested but no bombardment or assault takes place. Instead, the besieger attempts to persuade the defenders to surrender through negotiation, inducement, or through privations such as starvation. This may be done because the fortress is too strong for the attackers to capture through bombardment and assault, or because if the fortification when captured is undamaged it immediately becomes a functional strong point for the former besiegers.
 Circumvallation: a line of fortifications built by the attackers around the besieged fortification facing towards it.
 Contravallation: a second line of fortifications behind the circumvallation facing away from the enemy fort to protect the besiegers from attacks by allies of the besieged.
 Escalade: the act of scaling defensive walls or ramparts with the aid of ladders, a prominent feature of siege warfare in medieval times.
 Chevaux de frise: sword blades chained together to incapacitate people trying to charge into a breach in the walls.
 Investment: surrounding an enemy fort (or town) with armed forces to prevent entry or escape.
 Military mining, undermining of defence positions either fortifications or enemy front line trenches (see also camouflet). 
 Parallel trenches
 Sapping: digging approach trench towards enemy fortifications within range of the besieged guns.
 Siege engines: specialised weapons used to overcome fortifications of a besieged fort or town; in modern times, the task has fallen to large artillery pieces.
 Siege train: specialised siege artillery moved in a column by road or by rail.
 Siege tower: a wooden tower on wheels constructed to protect assailants and ladders while approaching the defensive walls of a fortification.
 Sortie (also "to sally (forth)"): a sudden attack against a besieging enemy from within a besieged fort or town.
 Surrender at discretion: unconditional surrender instead of surrendering with terms.
 Skirmish
 Switch position: A defensive position oblique to, and connecting, successive defensive positions paralleling the front.
 thunder run: quick surprise penetration attack deep into enemy territory, designed to confuse and potentially break enemy lines and take a city.
 Vedette, a mounted sentry or outpost, who has the function of bringing information, giving signals or warnings of danger, etc.
 Withdrawal (military): retreat (i.e., pulling back) of troops from a battlefield (can be either orderly or unorderly; fighting or by rout)

Ordnance
These terms concern identification of means of combat to inflict damage on the opponent.

Edged
Weapons that inflict damage through cutting or stabbing.

 Bayonet
 Bill (weapon)
 Danish axe
 Halberd
 Hands
 Knife or Dagger
 Lance
 Pole weapon or poleaxe
 Pike (weapon)
 Partisan (weapon)
 Sabre
 Spear
 Sword

Projectile munitions
Munitions are weapons and ordnance that inflict damage through impact.

Individual
 Bow (weapon)
 Crossbow
 Sling (weapon) and slingshot (hand catapult)

Firearms
 Carbine
 Machine gun
 Musket
 Pistol
 Revolver
 Rifle
 Shotgun
 Submachine gun

Artillery
Crew-served, non-vehicle mounted weapons
 Ballista
 Catapult
 Mangonel
 Onager (siege weapon)
 Trebuchet

Guns
 Bombard (weapon)
 Cannon
 Autocannon
 Basilisk
 Bombard
 Carronade
 Culverin
 Demi-cannon
 Demi-culverin
 Falconet
 Hand cannon
 Minion
 Saker
 Gun
 Field gun
 Naval artillery
 Howitzer
 Mortar (weapon)

Explosives
Explosive ordnance causes damage through release of chemical energy.

 Artillery shell
 Bangalore torpedo
 Camouflet
 Grenade
 Hand grenade
 Rifle grenade (see also Grenade launcher)
 Rocket propelled grenade
 Land mine
 Anti-tank mine
 Anti-personnel mine

Incendiary
Incendiary ordnance causes damage through release of heat.

 Flamethrower
 Greek fire
 Napalm
 White phosphorus

Vehicles
 Armored car
 Chariot
 Half-track
 Armored personnel carrier
 Tank
 Tank destroyer

Engineering
See also List of fortifications

 Abatis: a defensive obstacle consisting of an obstacle formed (in the modern era) of the branches of trees laid in a row.

 Banquette, or fire step
 Barbed wire
 Bartizan: a cylindrical turret or sentry post projecting beyond the parapet of a fort or castle
 Bastion
 Bastion fortress: a star-shaped fortress surrounding a town or city (also known as star fort or Trace italienne).
 Battery: an artillery position, which may be fortified.
 Berm
 Blast wall: a barrier for protection from high explosive blast.
 Blockhouse: a) Medieval and Renaissance - a small artillery tower, b) 18th and 19th centuries - a small colonial wooden fort, c) 20th century - a large concrete defensive structure.
 Breastwork
 Bulwark
 Bunker: a heavily fortified, mainly underground, facility used as a defensive position; also commonly used as command centres for high-level officers.
 Caponier: a defensive firing position either projecting into, or traversing the ditch of a fort.
 Carnot wall: a wall pierced with loopholes, sited above the scarp of a ditch but below the rampart.
 Casemate: a vaulted chamber for protected storage, accommodation or if provided with an embrasure, for artillery
 Castle
 Medieval fortification
 Arrow slit (arrow loop, loophole)
 Barbican
 Chemin de ronde
 Concentric castle
 Drawbridge
 Gatehouse
 Keep or donjon
 Moat
 Machicolation
 Murder-hole
 Portcullis
 Citadel
 Counterscarp: the opposing side of a ditch in front of a fortification, i.e., the side facing it.
 Counterscarp gallery: a firing position built into the counterscarp wall of the ditch.
 Counter mine: anti-siege tunnel dug by a fortification's defenders below an attacker's mine with the intent of destroying it before the attackers are able to damage (the foundations of) the fortification's walls.
 Coupure
 Covertway
 Defensive fighting position; for example, a rifle pit, sangar or fox hole.
 Demi-lune
 Ditch: a dry moat.
 Dragon's teeth: Triangular obstacles acting as roadblocks for armoured vehicles.
 Dutch Water Line: a series of water-based defensive measures designed to flood large areas in case of attack.
 Earthworks
 Embrasure: an opening in a parapet or casemate, for a gun to fire through.
 Fascine is a bundle of sticks or similar, were used in military defences for revetting (shoring up) trenches or ramparts, especially around artillery batteries, or filling in ditches and trenches during an attack.
 Flèche: an arrow shaped outwork, smaller than a ravelin or a lunette, with 2 faces with a parapet and an open gorge
 Fort
 Fortification
 Fortress
 Gabion: a large basket filled with earth, used to form a temporary parapet for artillery
 Glacis: a bank of earth sloping away from the fort, to protect it from direct artillery fire
 Gorge: opening at the rear of an outwork for access by defending troops from the main defensive position
 Hill fort (New Zealand: Pa (Māori))
 Lunette: an outwork consisting of a salient angle with two flanks and an open gorge.
 Magazine: a protected place within a fort, where ammunition is stored and prepared for use.
 Mining: a siege method used since antiquity against a walled city, fortress or castle, where tunnels are dug to undermine the foundations of the walls; also see counter-mine.
 Outwork: a minor defence, built or established outside the principal fortification limits, detached or semidetached.
 Parapet: a wall at the edge of the rampart to protect the defenders.
 Pillbox: a small concrete guard post.
 Polygonal fort: a later type of fort without bastions.
 Rampart: The main defensive wall of a fortification.
 Ravelin: a triangular fortification in front of bastion as a detached outwork.
 Redan: a V-shaped salient angle toward an expected attack, made from earthworks or other material.
 Redoubt: a fort or fort system usually consisting of an enclosed defensive emplacement outside a larger fort, which can be constructed of earthworks, stone or brick.
 Reduit: an enclosed defensive emplacement inside a larger fort; provides protection during a persistent attack.
 Sangar: a small temporary fortified position with a breastwork originally of stone, but built of sandbags and similar materials in modern times.
 Sally port
 Sapping
 Scarp: the side of a ditch in front of a fortification facing away from it.
 Sconce: a small protective fortification, such as an earthwork, often placed on a mound as a defensive work for artillery.
 Sea fort: a coastal fort entirely surrounded by the sea, either built on a rock or directly onto the sea bed.
 Slighting: the deliberate destruction of an (abandoned) fortification without opposition from its (former) occupants and/or defenders.
 Sortie
 Star fort: a star-shaped fortress surrounding a town or city (also known as Bastion fortress or Trace italienne).
 Tenaille (archaic Tenalia): an advanced pincer-shaped defensive work in front of the main defences of a fortress.
 Terreplein: the fighting platform on top of a rampart, behind the parapet.
 Tête-de-pont: a temporary defensive work defending a bridge at the end closest to the enemy.
 Trace italienne: a star-shaped fortress surrounding a town or city (also known as Bastion fortress or star fort).
 Trench

Geographic
Defile: a geographic term for a narrow pass or gorge between mountains. It has its origins as a military description of a pass through which troops can march only in a narrow column or with a narrow front.
Debouch: 
To emerge from a defile or similar into open country; 
A fortification at the end of a defile; 
Water that flows out of a defile into a wider place such as a lake.

Naval

Arms and services
These terms concern combat arms and supporting services of armed forces used in naval warfare.

Doctrinal
These terms concern the type of use of naval armed forces.
 Blockade
 Coup de grâce: a final shot intended to finish off a sinking (enemy) ship (which should be distinguished from scuttling).
 Crossing the Tee
 Vanguard—the leading part of an advancing military formation
 Line astern, line ahead, or line of battle
 Raking fire
 Scuttling
 Weather gage

Operational 
 Adrift: Loose and out of control. Typically applied to a ship or vessel that has lost power and is unable to control its movement.
 Aft: Any part of the ship closer to the stern than you currently are.
 All Hands: The entire ship's crew to include all officers and enlisted.
 Aye, Aye: Response acknowledging and understanding a command. 
 Bow: Front of the ship.
 Below: Any deck beneath the one you are currently on.
 Carry on: An order given to continue work or duties.
 Cast off: To throw off, to let go, to unfurl.
 Colours: Raising and lowering of the National Ensign, the National flag, and organization flags.
 Fathom: Unit of measurement generally used for depth from sea level to sea floor.
 General Quarters: Battle stations. Generally set when the ship is about to engage in battle or hostile activities. 
 Jettison: To throw or dispose of something over the side of the ship. 
 Ladder: Also known as a ladder well. Much like civilian stairs, however much steeper.
 Leave: Vacation time nearly completely free unless an emergency recall occurs.
 Shore leave or Liberty (US): Permission to leave the ship/base to enjoy non-work activities.
 Mid-watch: Tends to be the midnight to 0400 watch. Also known as "balls to four" due to military time equivalent 0000-0400.
 Port Side: Left hand side of the ship.
 Quarters: Generally the morning assembly of all hands for muster and accountability.
 Starboard: Right hand side of the ship.
 Stern: Rear of the ship.
 Taps: Lights out, time to sleep.
 Turn to: Start working.
 Working Aloft: Working above the highest deck, generally performing maintenance on the ship's mast or antennas.

Ordnance
 Sea mine
 Torpedo
 Turret

Vessels
 Aircraft carrier
 Helicopter carrier
 Escort carrier
 Fleet carrier
 Light carrier
 Fighter catapult ship
 Catapult aircraft merchant ship
 Merchant aircraft carrier
 Aircraft maintenance carrier
 Flagship
 Special service ship
 Troopship
 Ship's tender
 Attack transport
 Battleship
 Dreadnought
 Pocket battleship
 Seaplane tender
 Sloop
 Battlecruiser
 Cruiser
 Heavy cruiser
 Armored cruiser
 Light cruiser
 Scout cruiser
 Destroyer
 Destroyer escort
 Destroyer flotilla leader
 Destroyer depot ship
 Frigate
 Corvette
 Hovercraft
 Landing Craft Air Cushion
 Landing craft depot ship
 Merchant cruiser
 Submarine
 Submarine tender
 Midget submarine
 Cruiser submarine
 Hunter-killer submarine
 Ballistic missile submarine
 Guided missile submarine
 Submarine chaser
 Submarine aircraft carrier
 Torpedo boat
 Amphibious command ship
 Amphibious assault ship
 Amphibious transport dock
 Dock landing ship
 Expeditionary transfer dock
 Littoral combat ship
 Coastal defence ship
 Barracks ship
 Patrol boat
 Research vessel
 Survey ship
 Dry dock
 Torpedo trials craft
 Guard ship
 Cable layer
 Cable repair ship
 Cargo ship
 Attack cargo ship
 Vehicle cargo ship
 Dry cargo ship
 Replenishment oiler
 Oil tanker
 Maritime prepositioning ship
 Offshore supply ship
 Container ship
 Hospital ship
 Fast combat support ship
 Expeditionary fast transport
 Salvage ship
 Instrumentation ship
 Fleet ocean tug
 Riverine command ship
 Special operations insertion ship
 High-speed transport
 Maritime security cutter
 Medium endurance cutter
 High endurance cutter
 Fast response cutter
 Marine protector
 Landing ship
 Tank landing ship
 Icebreaker
 Heavy icebreaker
 Inland construction tender
 Seagoing buoy tender
 Coastal buoy tender
 Logistic support ship
 Floating battery
 Training ship
 Minelayer
 Mine countermeasures vessel
 Minesweeper
 Gunboat
 Riverine gunboat
 Dock landing ship
 Monitor
 Breastwork monitor
 Riverine monitor
 Technical research ship
 Self defense test ship
 Self-propelled radar station
 Fast sea frame
 Crane ship
 Aviation logistics support ship
 Moored training ship
 Naval trawler

Engineering

Air

Arms and services
These terms concern combat arms and supporting services of armed forces used in air warfare.

Operational
 Sortie: used by air forces to indicate an aircraft mission count (flew seven sorties) or in the sense of a departure (the aircraft sortied).

Doctrinal
These terms concern the type of use of aviation armed forces.

Tactics
 Bombing: specifically area bombing, carpet bombing and pattern bombing.
 Sortie: a mission flown by an aircraft

Ordnance
 Bomb
 Missile

Aircraft
 Airship
 Bomber
 Dirigible, balloon
 Fighter
 Fighter bomber
 Spotter plane

Engineering

See also
 Glossary of German military terms
 Glossary of military abbreviations
 List of British ordnance terms
 List of equipment used in World War II
 List of military tactics
 List of World War II electronic warfare equipment

References

External links
 A Dictionary of Military Architecture: Fortification and Fieldworks from the Iron Age to the Eighteenth Century by Stephen Francis Wyley, drawings by Steven Lowe
 Victorian Forts glossary. A more comprehensive version has been published as A Handbook of Military Terms by David Moore at the same site
 Military Earthworks Terms by the National Park Service, United States Department of the Interior
 Military Terms Dictionary Lookup on military terms offering you clear definitions by some of the most reliable reference works in this field.
 Military acronyms and abbreviations

Terms

Established